Agent Sawu (born 24 October 1971) is a Zimbabwean former football striker and current manager.

He operated at Rising Stars Football Academy in Zimbabwe helping young kids across Bulawayo realize their talent and exploit to their maximum potential. He is currently part coaching staff at Bantu Rovers F.C in the Zimbabwean Top Flight league.

Career
Sawu played club football in Zimbabwe before moving abroad to play in China, Cyprus, South Africa and Switzerland. He spent time with Premier Soccer League clubs Bush Bucks and Durban Stars before embarking on a coaching career in 2009.

International career
He was a member of the Zimbabwean 2004 African Nations Cup team, who finished bottom of their group in the first round of competition, thus failing to secure qualification for the quarter-finals.

References

External links

1971 births
Living people
Zimbabwean footballers
Zimbabwe international footballers
Zimbabwean expatriate footballers
Swiss Super League players
Cypriot First Division players
APOP Kinyras FC players
FC Luzern players
BSC Young Boys players
FC Basel players
FC Wil players
SC Kriens players
Bush Bucks F.C. players
Dynamos F.C. players
Durban Stars F.C. players
Expatriate footballers in Cyprus
Expatriate footballers in China
Expatriate soccer players in South Africa
Expatriate footballers in Switzerland
Zimbabwean expatriate sportspeople in Cyprus
Zimbabwean expatriate sportspeople in China
Zimbabwean expatriate sportspeople in South Africa
Zimbabwean expatriate sportspeople in Switzerland
Chongqing Liangjiang Athletic F.C. players
2004 African Cup of Nations players
Association football forwards